Cavalia is a company that specializes in the creation, production and touring of live shows. It was founded by Normand Latourelle. It is headquartered in Montreal, Canada.

Name origin
Cavalia is a fabricated word, inspired by the Italian, Spanish and French words for horse (cavallo, caballo and cheval) and the French and English word cavalier.

History
Created in 2003 by  under the name of "Voltige", the very first show was held in Shawinigan, Quebec. The large scale multimedia performance the company delivers is often compared to Cirque du Soleil, of which he was one of the four original co-founders as well as Managing Director and Executive Vice-President from 1985 to 1990. Apart from Latourelle's history, Cavalia has no affiliation with Cirque du Soleil and remains a separate entity. The company's original production, Cavalia: A Magical Encounter Between Human and Horse, has been touring since 2003. Odysseo, Cavalia's newest show, premiered in October 2011 in Laval, Quebec.

In May 2009, the Government of Canada provided Cavalia with a $4-million loan to Cavalia Inc. to develop new productions and construct a horse-training facility in Sutton, Quebec.

First Production: Cavalia, A Magical Encounter Between Human and Horse
The first show is a tribute to the relationship between humans and horses throughout history. It is described as an equestrian ballet, it expresses a "dream of freedom, cooperation and harmony". Riders, acrobats, dancers and musicians share the stage with horses. A Magical Encounter Between Human and Horse features about 50 horses, 5 musicians and 45 artists including riders, aerialists, and acrobats.

Performers

Many of the horses are Lusitanos, and the remainder are Andalusian horses, Canadian Horses, American Quarter Horses, Paint horses, Belgians, Percherons, Arabians, and Appaloosas. The show's horses were originally from Canada, France, Spain, and the United States. These horses eat 40 bales of hay per day; they consume 900 kg (1980 lb) of grain and 20 kg (44 lb) carrots.

The show also features a team of over 20 human stars from Guinea, Canada, France, Kyrgyzstan, United States, Australia, Mexico, and Morocco, including acrobats and horsemen and horsewomen, including most notably, the amazing husband and wife team of Frederic Pignon and Magali Delgado.

The Big Top
150 people work for the tent raising and site preparation. The installation lasts 12 days, while the removal is completed in three days. The tent is 30 metres high, the equivalent height of a 10-story building. 6635 m2 of fabric is used to create the marquee that extends over an area of 2 440m2. A screen of 70 metres serves as a backdrop for projections and multimedia effects. The stage is 50 metres in width, the length of an Olympic pool. 2,500 tons of sand, earth and gravel, the equivalent of 100 trucks, are used to create the scene. The Big Top can accommodate up to 2, 000 spectators.  Cavalia's village includes nine tents: the White Big Top, a Rendezvous VIP Tent, Entrance tents, two Artistic tents, two warming tents, the Stable and the Staff Cafeteria.

Second Production: Odysseo

Odysseo was launched in 2011. 
Cavalia summarizes the show as depicting "horses and humans leaving together to meet a world between dream and reality by traveling through the great wonders that nature has offered, deserts, waterfalls, canyons and glaciers." This second show portrays equestrian arts, acrobatics, music, multimedia projections and special effects under one Big Top. It features some 300 different costumes. Non-riders do acrobatics and sing west African songs.

Odysseo's key players

 Normand Latourelle: President and Artistic Director
 Wayne Fowkes: Director
 Guillaume Lord: Set Design
 Geodezik: Visual Design
 Alain Lortie: Lighting Design
 George Lévesque and Michèle Hamel: Costumes
 Darren Charles and Alain Gauthier: choreography
 Mathieu Roy and Elsie Morin : Acrobatic Number Conception

The Big Top

Like the first production's Big Top, Odysseo's tent was designed specifically for the needs of the show and the vision of its creators. It is two and a quarter times bigger than the first one and is (as of September 2013) the largest touring tent in the world.

The exterior consists of four poles, four arches and 2.1 square miles of canvas; is 38 meters high; measures 115 metres long and 65 metres wide;
and occupies a surface area which extends over 120 metres in length and 95 metres wide. The interior is 2500 square metres; composed of 6,000 tons of rock, earth and sand; and has a seating capacity of 2290 people.

Installation requires 40 motors and a mechanical crane; Each arch is composed of eight 9-meter-long sections. The arches rise to 27 meters and are 62 meters long; the painting is composed of 16 pieces; 1310 piles and anchor points are used; 166 posts are required to assemble the walls of the tower; wiring has a length of 5.8 km; It takes 20 trucks to transport the tent.

References

External links
 Odysseo Equestrian Show
 Odysseo, more than a horse show
 Images from Brussels event

Horse circuses and entertainment
Companies based in Montreal
Entertainment companies of Canada